Kodijärve is a village in Kambja Parish, Tartu County in eastern Estonia.

Kodijärve is the birthplace of heavyweight Greco-Roman wrestler and Olympic gold medalist Johannes Kotkas (1915-1998).

Gallery

References

 

Villages in Tartu County
Kreis Dorpat